Benasquese (autonym: benasqués), often called patués by its speakers, is the native Romance linguistic variety of the Valley of Benasque, in the province of Huesca (Aragon, Spain). 

Usually regarded as an Aragonese dialect (a particular variety of Ribagorçan, transitional into Catalan, Gascon and Aragonese), it has also been considered an extreme North-Western Catalan dialect in the past by a few linguists, and more recently, a language in its own right. Benasquese itself is often divided into two subdialects, Upper Benasquese and Lower Benasquese.

Although still vigorously spoken (when compared to other Aragonese varieties) by some 1,000 to 2,000 speakers, Benasquese is also in fast decline.

References
 A. Ballarín, Diccionario del benasqués, Zaragoza, 2nd ed (1978).
 J.A. Saura, Elementos de fonética y morfosintaxis benasquesas, Zaragoza, Gara d'Edizions-Institución Fernando el Católico (2003).

External links
Benasqués entry at the Gran Enciclopedia Aragonesa (in Spanish).
 Diccionario Digital del Benasqués An online dictionary.

Aragonese dialects